"Qué Pretendes" (stylized in upper case; English: “What do you pretend?”) is a song by Colombian singer J Balvin and Puerto Rican rapper Bad Bunny. The song was released on 28 June 2019 as the first single from their collaborative album Oasis. The song marks the pair's third collaboration (excluding remixes) on a single following 2018's "I Like It" with Cardi B.

Commercial performance  
Like the rest of the songs of Oasis, "Qué Pretendes" managed to chart on the Billboard Hot Latin Songs chart, peaking at number two. It was the first single to chart on the Billboard Hot 100 from the album, peaking at number 65.

Lyrics and composition 
The song's lyrics revolve around being done with an ex who keeps on returning.  is "Who do you think you are?" on Billboard's lyrics translation.

Music video 
The video was released together with the song on 28 June through J Balvin's YouTube channel. It surpassed three million views in YouTube in less than 24 hours.

Live performances
"Qué Pretendes" was performed live at the 2019 MTV Video Music Awards on 26 August 2019.

Charts

Weekly charts

Year-end charts

Certifications

See also
List of Billboard number-one Latin songs of 2019

References 

2019 songs
2019 singles
J Balvin songs
Bad Bunny songs
Music videos directed by Colin Tilley
Spanish-language songs
Songs written by Bad Bunny
Songs written by J Balvin